Pine Dock Water Aerodrome  is located in Big Bullhead Bay on Lake Winnipeg,  south of Pine Dock, on Lake Winnipeg, Manitoba, Canada.

Pine Dock Airport, which is a private airport owned by Lakeside Aviation / Interlakeaviation, serves as a regional charter aircraft service for the region and for Bennett Lake Lodge and Outcamps.

See also
Pine Dock Airport

References

Registered aerodromes in Manitoba
Seaplane bases in Manitoba